Schwabach refers to:

Schwabach, a city in Bavaria, Germany
Schwabach (Rednitz), a river near Nuremberg in Bavaria, Germany, tributary of the Rednitz
Schwabach (Regnitz), a river of Bavaria, Germany, tributary of the Regnitz
Schwabach test, a variant of Rinne test for hearing loss
Schwabacher, a blackletter typeface